Gyraulus mauritianus is a species of small, mostly air-breathing, freshwater snail, aquatic pulmonate gastropod mollusk in the family Planorbidae, the ram's horn snails. This species is endemic to Mauritius.

References

mauritianus
Gastropods of Africa
Freshwater snails
Endemic fauna of Mauritius
Gastropods described in 1876
Taxonomy articles created by Polbot